Valérie Quennessen (3 December 1957 – 19 March 1989) was a French theatre and film actress.

Biography
Quennessen was born near Paris in Boulogne-Billancourt, of Jewish French/Polish parentage, and dedicated much of her childhood to pursuing her dream of becoming an acrobat. She quickly reached a level of competence and received an award for her expertise at the age of ten. By her teens, she had given up acrobatics and enrolled in acting classes, not because she particularly wanted to get into show business, but to help her overcome social anxiety.  She found that she not only overcame her shyness via acting, but she also enjoyed performing.  She studied drama first briefly at the École nationale supérieure des arts et techniques du théâtre, then at the Conservatoire National d'Art Dramatique, in Paris, from 1976 to 1979, and appeared in several theater productions, notably Chers Zoiseaux, by Jean Anouilh, which premiered in 1976, and Pirandello's Nuova colonia (1977).

She made her first film appearances in a pair of 1976 French films: Le Petit Marcel and Le Plein de super. She continued to appear in the occasional French film and television show, and in 1979 she landed one of the main roles in the American film French Postcards (Willard Huyck), working alongside Miles Chapin, Debra Winger and Mandy Patinkin. She followed up that film by playing Princess Yasimina in John Milius's 1982 film Conan the Barbarian with Arnold Schwarzenegger in the title role.

Randal Kleiser's Summer Loverswas the peak of her career for American audiences. This story of a love triangle on the Greek island of Santorini also starred Peter Gallagher and Daryl Hannah. During the filming of the movie, in which she played Lina, an archaeologist, Valérie is said to have discovered several pieces of pottery at the Akrotiri site that were more than 3,500 years old.

Shortly after Summer Lovers, Valérie Quennessen appeared in the short We Cannes, filmed during the 1982 film festival by François Manceaux, then gradually retired from acting, choosing to concentrate on raising her family. She and Francois Manceaux had two children, Antoine (1982) and Elsa (1985) both of them born in France. On March 19, 1989, she died in a car accident on the A13 highway in Saint-Ouen-des-Champs at the age of 31.

Her family members 
Her husband Francois Manceaux, who had a supporting role in Summer Lovers, is a director and writer who has worked in several TV movies and documentaries. Antoine, the oldest of her children, is a movie shorts producer and editor  while the youngest, Elsa, is a well known plastic artist living in Mexico City since 2012. Elsa moved to Amsterdam in 2009 to study at the Gerrit Rietveld Academie, and then in 2015 and 2016, after moving to Mexico, she attended a postgraduate program at SOMA.  She has shown her work in art galleries around the world on several occasions.

Filmography
 Le Petit Marcel (Jacques Fansten, 1976) as a receptionist
 Le Plein de super (Alain Cavalier, 1976) as Marie
 Nuova colonia (Anne Delbée, 1978, TV adaptation) as Mita
 La Tortue sur le dos (Luc Béraud, 1978) as a Nietzsche student
 Brigade des mineurs: Tête de rivière (Guy Lessertisseur, 1978—TV episode) as Doris
 On efface tout (Pascal Vidal, 1978)
 Martin et Léa (Alain Cavalier, 1979) as Cléo
 French Postcards (Willard Huyck, 1979) as Toni
 Pause-café (Serge Leroy, 1981—TV miniseries, one episode) as a secretary
 Silas (Sigi Rothemund, 1981—German TV miniseries, one episode) as Melinda, a washerwoman
 Les Uns et les Autres (Claude Lelouch, 1981) as Francis Huster's character girlfriend
 Conan the Barbarian (John Milius, 1982) as Princess Yasimina
 Summer Lovers (Randal Kleiser, 1982) as Lina
 We Cannes (François Manceaux, 1982 short) as Janine
 Quartier sud (Mathias Ledoux, 1984—TV) as Rebecca
 La petite commission (Jean-Paul Salomé, 1985 short) as Sister Clarisse
 Mode in France (William Klein, 1985—TV) as a model/female cop
 Haute tension: Eaux troubles (Alain Bonnot, 1989—TV episode) as Judith

Theatre
 Bajazet, by Jean Racine (director Stéphan Boublil, Studio d'Ivry, 1976)
 Phèdre, by Jean Racine (Antoine Bourseiller, Théâtre Récamier, 1976), as Ismène
 Chers Zoiseaux, by Jean Anouilh (Jean Anouilh and Roland Piétri, Comédie des Champs-Élysées, 1976), as one of the "Girls"
 Nuova colonia, by Luigi Pirandello (Anne Delbée, Nouveau Carré Silvia Montfort, 1977), as Mita
 Babylone, by Alain Gautré (Pierre Pradinas, Compagnie du Chapeau rouge, Avignon, 1979)

References

External links
 
 
 
 Valérie Quennessen by Xavier Loriot and Bruce Pinkerton, 2012.
 Valérie Quennessen - Filmaffinity

1957 births
1989 deaths
20th-century French actresses
Actresses from Paris
French National Academy of Dramatic Arts alumni
French film actresses
French stage actresses
Road incident deaths in France